Herbert Irving (November 5, 1917 – October 3, 2016) was an American businessman, philanthropist, and art collector. He co-founded Sysco, the world's largest food distributor, and was known for his contributions to the NewYork-Presbyterian Hospital/Columbia University Irving Medical Center.

Biography 
Irving was born on November 5, 1917, in Brooklyn. He received his bachelor's and master's degrees from the Wharton School of the University of Pennsylvania. He served with the United States Army in Europe during World War II and took part in the landing of Normandy.

He started his career in the frozen foods business by co-founding Global Frozen Foods with a brother-in-law. He founded Sysco in 1969 with John F. Baugh and Harry Rosenthal and served as the company's vice chairman and chair of the finance committee. He stepped down as vice chairman of Sysco's board in 1992 and remained a director until 1994.

Philanthropy 
After being treated by Columbia's doctors, Irving became the single largest benefactors to the Columbia University Medical Center (CUMC), funding the Herbert Irving Comprehensive Cancer Center in 1995 and endowing the Irving Scholars to support those starting a career in medical research. The contributions Irving made to the medical center totaled $300 million over thirty years, beginning in 1987, when he made the first donation of $8.5 million. A dozen programs, facilities, and professorships at the CUMC are named after Irving.

He and his wife were also known for their collection of Asian art. The couple donated over 1,300 objects and made donations worth over $80 million to the Metropolitan Museum of Art to support the museum's acquisition, exhibition, and publication of Asian art. They are the namesake of The Florence and Herbert Irving Asian Wing on the North side of the museum, which includes the galleries for Chinese art, the arts of Korea, and South and Southeast Asian art.

In 2017, he and his wife made a posthumous $700 million gift to Columbia to advance research and clinical programs for the treatment of cancer.

Personal life and family 
He married Florence Rapoport in 1941. He died on October 3, 2016, at age 98.

References 

1917 births
2016 deaths
American company founders
Wharton School of the University of Pennsylvania alumni
American philanthropists
Businesspeople from Brooklyn
American art collectors